The 2016 independent.ie Fitzgibbon Cup was the 100th staging of the Fitzgibbon Cup since its establishment in 1912. The semi-finals and final were hosted by Cork IT on 26 and 27 February 2016 where Mary Immaculate College won their first ever title.

Format

Group stage

Fifteen institutes of higher education compete in three groups of four and one group of three. Each team in a group plays all the other teams in the group once. Two points are awarded for a win and one for a draw.

Knockout stage

The four group winners play the four group runners-up in the quarter-finals. The semi-finals and final are played over a single weekend, usually the last Friday and Saturday in February.

Group stage

Group A

{| class="wikitable" 
!width=20|
!width=150 style="text-align:left;"|Team
!width=20|
!width=20|
!width=20|
!width=20|
!width=40|
!width=50|
!width=20|
!width=20|
|-style="background:#98FB98;"
|1||align=left| Limerick IT ||3||3||0||0||6-49||2-38||23||6
|- style="background:#CCCCFF;"
|2||align=left| UCD ||3||2||0||1||4-39||0-41||10||4
|-
|3||align=left| UCC ||3||1||0||2||5-45||4-37||11||2
|- 
|4||align=left| Maynooth University ||3||0||0||3||0-30||9-47||-44||0
|}

Group B

{| class="wikitable" 
!width=20|
!width=150 style="text-align:left;"|Team
!width=20|
!width=20|
!width=20|
!width=20|
!width=40|
!width=50|
!width=20|
!width=20|
|-style="background:#98FB98;"
|1||align=left| IT Carlow ||3||3||0||0||6-46||4-27||25||6
|- style="background:#CCCCFF;"
|2||align=left| WIT ||3||2||0||1||4-46||2-29||23||4
|-
|3||align=left| St. Pat's, Drumcondra ||3||0||1||2||3-43||7-53||-22||1
|-
|4||align=left| DCU ||3||0||1||2||4-37||4-63||-26||1
|}

Group C

{| class="wikitable" 
!width=20|
!width=150 style="text-align:left;"|Team
!width=20|
!width=20|
!width=20|
!width=20|
!width=40|
!width=50|
!width=20|
!width=20|
|-style="background:#98FB98;"
|1||align=left| Mary I Limerick ||3||2||0||1||5-49||5-33||16||4
|- style="background:#CCCCFF;"
|2||align=left| UL ||3||2||0||1||5-50||3-44||12||4
|-
|3||align=left| NUI Galway ||3||2||0||1||3-47||3-38||9||4

|-
|4||align=left| DIT ||3||0||0||3||2-26||4-57||-37||0
|}

Group D

{| class="wikitable" 
!width=20|
!width=150 style="text-align:left;"|Team
!width=20|
!width=20|
!width=20|
!width=20|
!width=40|
!width=50|
!width=20|
!width=20|
|-style="background:#98FB98;"
|1||align=left| CIT ||2||2||0||0||4-39||0-24||27||4
|- style="background:#CCCCFF;"
|2||align=left| GMIT ||2||1||0||1||1-11||3-26||-21||2
|- 
|3||align=left| UUJ ||2||0||0||2||0-21||2-21||-6||0
|}

Knockout stage

Quarter-finals
Group winners will have home advantage for the quarter-finals.

Semi-finals

Final

References

Fitzgibbon
Fitzgibbon Cup